David Aaron Carr (born March 28, 1999) is an American freestyle and folkstyle wrestler. In freestyle, he was the '19 junior world champion at 74 kilograms representing the United States. As a folkstyle wrestler, Carr is an NCAA Division I national champion, three-time NCAA Division I All-American, and four-time Big 12 Conference champion, the second to win his conference four times at Iowa State University. He was also a four-time OHSAA champion as a high schooler.

Folkstyle career

High school 
Carr was a five-time state champion. He won his first title as an eighth grader in Kentucky and then moved to Ohio. He won two state championships at Dayton Christian High School (Miamisburg, Ohio) DIII before switching to Perry High School in Ohio, where he won another two state (OHSAA) DI titles. He was the second-ranked recruit overall and the top-ranked recruit at 165 pounds by FloWrestling when he committed to Iowa State over Ohio State, Oklahoma State and many others. He received the Dave Schultz High School Excellence Award in the memory of Dave Schultz.

University 
Carr arrived to ISU to wrestle as a Cyclone at 157 pounds after committing in October 2017.

2018-19 
While redshirting, Carr compiled a 23–1 record wrestling unattached at open tournaments. He claimed titles at four of the five tournaments he competed in and third place at the tournament he lost in.

2019-20 
Carr had an outstanding freshman season competing as a Cyclone, compiling an 18–1 record overall and an unbeaten 9–0 at dual meets. His lone loss at the Cliff Keen Invitational to second-ranked Ryan Deakin. He became the fifth Cyclone freshman to claim a Big 12 Conference title, with notable wins over the #18 and #7-ranked wrestlers in the country. Carr was scheduled to compete at the NCAA championships as the third seed, however, the event was canceled due to the COVID-19 pandemic. After the season, he was named a first-team NCAA Division I All-American due to his performance through the season.

2020-21 
In October 2020, the NCAA granted an extra year of eligibility to winter athletes due to the previous season being cut short. Carr competed as a sophomore, and compiled a 12–0 record with three falls, four technical falls, three majors and two decisions during regular season. He claimed his second straight Big 12 title and his first NCAA championship at 157 pounds.

Freestyle career

Cadet & Junior 
Carr was a standout youth-level freestyle wrestler and his eligibility to compete at this level expired in early 2020. As a cadet, he was a World bronze-medalist, a US National champion and a two-time National finalist. As a junior, he became the 19' World Champion and was also a US Open and Fargo National champion.

Senior

2019 
Carr made his senior debut as an 18-year old at the Dave Schultz Memorial International. He won his first two bouts in a row with a notable win over four-time NCAA Division I All-American Dylan Ness before being thrown to the consolation bracket by the accomplished Olympian Frank Molinaro in a very close 8-9 decision. He then faced another DI All-American in Sammy Sasso, whom he also lost to on points.

Carr then went on to compete at the Granma y Cerro Pelado International. He once again defeated two opponents in a row with a victory over an NCAA Division I All-American in Anthony Collica. He was then defeated by four-time All-American Brandon Sorensen and three-timer Lavion Mayes, but still competed for the bronze-medal against Franklin Maren, whom he defeated to claim the medal.

2020 
Carr competed at the US National Championships (where he was the fifth seed) on October 10–11, making his senior debut at 74 kilograms. After a four-match winning streak (including a victory over Dan Hodge Trophy finalist Ryan Deakin), he was defeated three times in a row by the defending US National title holder Logan Massa, three-time All-American and U23 World Team Member Hayden Hidlay and Deakin, respectively, placing sixth.

Personal life 
David is the son of Olympic medalist and former Iowa State Cyclone Nate Carr.

Freestyle record 

! colspan="7"| Senior Freestyle Matches
|-
!  Res.
!  Record
!  Opponent
!  Score
!  Date
!  Event
!  Location
|-
! style=background:white colspan=7 |
|-
|Win
|18–10
|align=left| Zelimkhan Tohuzov
|style="font-size:88%"|TF 11–0
|style="font-size:88%" rowspan=4|July 20, 2022
|style="font-size:88%" rowspan=4|2022 Poland Open
|style="text-align:left;font-size:88%;" rowspan=4|
 Warsaw, Poland
|-
|Win
|17–10
|align=left| Giorgi Sulava
|style="font-size:88%"|TF 10–0
|-
|Win
|16–10
|align=left| Shengsong Xia
|style="font-size:88%"|TF 12–1
|-
|Win
|15–10
|align=left| Menghejigan Menghejigan
|style="font-size:88%"|TF 13–2
|-
! style=background:white colspan=7 |
|-
|Win
|14–10
|align=left| Joey Lavallee
|style="font-size:88%"|TF 16–6
|style="font-size:88%"|June 3, 2022
|style="font-size:88%"|2022 Final X: Stillwater
|style="text-align:left;font-size:88%;"|
 Stillwater, Oklahoma
|-
|Win
|13–10
|align=left| Thomas Gantt
|style="font-size:88%"|TF 10–0
|style="font-size:88%" rowspan=4|May 21–22, 2022
|style="font-size:88%" rowspan=4|2022 US World Team Trials
|style="text-align:left;font-size:88%;" rowspan=4|
 Coralville, Iowa
|-
|Win
|12–10
|align=left| Josh Shields
|style="font-size:88%"|9–4
|-
|Loss
|11–10
|align=left| Jason Nolf
|style="font-size:88%"|Fall
|-
|Win
|11–9
|align=left| Collin Purinton
|style="font-size:88%"|15–6
|-
! style=background:white colspan=7 |
|-
|Loss
|10–9
|align=left| Thomas Gantt
|style="font-size:88%"|1–7
|style="font-size:88%" rowspan=3|April 2–3, 2021
|style="font-size:88%" rowspan=3|2020 US Olympic Team Trials
|style="text-align:left;font-size:88%;" rowspan=3| Forth Worth, Texas
|-
|Loss
|10–8
|align=left| Jason Nolf
|style="font-size:88%"|TF 0–10
|-
|Win
|10–7
|align=left| Logan Massa
|style="font-size:88%"|8–0
|-
! style=background:white colspan=7 |
|-
|Loss
|9–7
|align=left| Ryan Deakin
|style="font-size:88%"|2–5
|style="font-size:88%" rowspan=7|October 10–11, 2020
|style="font-size:88%" rowspan=7|2020 US Senior Nationals
|style="text-align:left;font-size:88%;" rowspan=7|
 Coralville, Iowa
|-
|Loss
|9–6
|align=left| Hayden Hidlay
|style="font-size:88%"|5–10
|-
|Loss
|9–5
|align=left| Logan Massa
|style="font-size:88%"|0–4
|-
|Win
|9–4
|align=left| Ryan Deakin
|style="font-size:88%"|6–5
|-
|Win
|8–4
|align=left| Renaldo Rodriguez-Spencer
|style="font-size:88%"|TF 12–1
|-
|Win
|7–4
|align=left| Jacob Wright
|style="font-size:88%"|TF 10–0
|-
|Win
|6–4
|align=left| Andy Hurla
|style="font-size:88%"|TF 10–0
|-
! style=background:white colspan=7 |
|-
|Win
|5–4
|align=left| Franklin Maren
|style="font-size:88%"|
|style="font-size:88%" rowspan=5|February 15–23, 2019
|style="font-size:88%" rowspan=5|2019 Granma y Cerro Pelado International
|style="text-align:left;font-size:88%;" rowspan=5|
 Havana, Cuba
|-
|Loss
|4–4
|align=left| Lavion Mayes
|style="font-size:88%"|
|-
|Loss
|4–3
|align=left| Brandon Sorensen
|style="font-size:88%"|
|-
|Win
|4–2
|align=left| Anthony Collica
|style="font-size:88%"|
|-
|Win
|3–2
|align=left| Justin DeAngelis
|style="font-size:88%"|
|-
! style=background:white colspan=7 |
|-
|Loss
|2–2
|align=left| Sammy Sasso
|style="font-size:88%"|2–7
|style="font-size:88%" rowspan=4|January 24–26, 2019
|style="font-size:88%" rowspan=4|2019 Dave Schultz Memorial International
|style="text-align:left;font-size:88%;" rowspan=4|
 Colorado Springs, Colorado
|-
|Loss
|2–1
|align=left| Frank Molinaro
|style="font-size:88%"|8–9
|-
|Win
|2–0
|align=left| Dylan Ness
|style="font-size:88%"|7–1
|-
|Win
|1–0
|align=left| Justin Deangelis
|style="font-size:88%"|11–2

NCAA record 

! colspan="8"| NCAA Division I Record
|-
!  Res.
!  Record
!  Opponent
!  Score
!  Date
!  Event
|-
! style=background:white colspan=6 | 2021 NCAA Championships  at 157 lbs
|-
|Win
|38–1
|align=left| Jesse Dellavecchia
|style="font-size:88%"|4–0
|style="font-size:88%" rowspan=5|March 18–20, 2021
|style="font-size:88%" rowspan=5|2021 NCAA Division I National Championships
|-
|Win
|37–1
|align=left| Hayden Hidlay
|style="font-size:88%"|6–4
|-
|Win
|36–1
|align=left| Brayton Lee
|style="font-size:88%"|4–2
|-
|Win
|35–1
|align=left| Will Lewan
|style="font-size:88%"|MD 10–2
|-
|Win
|34–1
|align=left| Markus Hartman
|style="font-size:88%"|MD 16–2
|-
! style=background:white colspan=6 |2021 Big 12 Conference  at 157 lbs
|-
|Win
|33–1
|align=left| Jared Franek
|style="font-size:88%"|6–1
|style="font-size:88%" rowspan=3|March 6–7, 2021
|style="font-size:88%" rowspan=3|2021 Big 12 Conference Championships
|-
|Win
|32–1
|align=left| Cade DeVos
|style="font-size:88%"|8–2
|-
|Win
|31–1
|align=left| Parker Simington
|style="font-size:88%"|Fall
|-
|Win
|30–1
|align=left|Derek Holschlag
|style="font-size:88%"|TF 19–2
|style="font-size:88%" rowspan=2|February 14, 2021
|style="font-size:88%"|Iowa State - Northern Iowa Dual
|-
|Win
|29–1
|align=left|Hunter Balk
|style="font-size:88%"|Fall
|style="font-size:88%"|Arizona State - Iowa State Dual
|-
|Win
|28–1
|align=left|Cade DeVos
|style="font-size:88%"|MD 10–2
|style="font-size:88%" rowspan=2|February 7, 2021
|style="font-size:88%"|Iowa State - South Dakota State Dual
|-
|Win
|27–1
|align=left|Jared Franek
|style="font-size:88%"|MD 16–5
|style="font-size:88%"|Iowa State - North Dakota State Dual
|-
|Win
|26–1
|align=left|Wyatt Sheets
|style="font-size:88%"|8–4
|style="font-size:88%" rowspan=3|January 30, 2021
|style="font-size:88%"|Oklahoma State - Iowa State Dual
|-
|Win
|25–1
|align=left|Ronnie Gentile
|style="font-size:88%"|TF 25–9
|style="font-size:88%"|Lindenwood (Mo) - Iowa State Dual
|-
|Win
|24–1
|align=left|Nolan Miller-Johnston
|style="font-size:88%"|Fall
|style="font-size:88%"|Iowa Central Community College - Iowa State Dual
|-
|Win
|23–1
|align=left|Justin Thomas
|style="font-size:88%"|4–0
|style="font-size:88%"|January 24, 2021
|style="font-size:88%"|Oklahoma - Iowa State Dual
|-
|Win
|22–1
|align=left|Jarrett Jacques
|style="font-size:88%"|MD 14–1
|style="font-size:88%"|January 17, 2021
|style="font-size:88%"|Missouri - Iowa State Dual
|-
|Win
|21–1
|align=left|Jacob Wasser
|style="font-size:88%"|Fall
|style="font-size:88%" rowspan=2|January 10, 2021
|style="font-size:88%"|Nebraska-Kearney - Iowa State Dual
|-
|Win
|20–1
|align=left|Daniel Ruiz
|style="font-size:88%"|TF 22–4
|style="font-size:88%"|Loras - Iowa State Dual
|-
|Win
|19–1
|align=left|David Hollingsworth
|style="font-size:88%"|TF 17–0
|style="font-size:88%"|January 3, 2021
|style="font-size:88%"|Wartburg - Iowa State Dual
|-
! style=background:lighgrey colspan=6 |Start of 2020-2021 Season (sophomore year)
|-
! style=background:lighgrey colspan=6 |End of 2019-2020 Season (freshman year)
|-
! style=background:white colspan=6 |2020 Big 12 Conference  at 157 lbs
|-
|Win
|18–1
|align=left| Wyatt Sheets
|style="font-size:88%"|6–4
|style="font-size:88%" rowspan=3|March 7–8, 2020
|style="font-size:88%" rowspan=3|2020 Big 12 Championships
|-
|Win
|17–1
|align=left| Justin Thomas
|style="font-size:88%"|4–1
|-
|Win
|16–1
|align=left| Dewey Krueger
|style="font-size:88%"|11–5
|-
! style=background:white colspan=6 |2020 Last Chance Open at 157 lbs
|-
|Win
|15–1
|align=left| Eric Owens
|style="font-size:88%"|Fall
|style="font-size:88%"|February 22, 2020
|style="font-size:88%"|2020 Last Chance Open
|-
|Win
|14–1
|align=left| Wyatt Sheets
|style="font-size:88%"|MD 14–6
|style="font-size:88%"|January 26, 2020
|style="font-size:88%"|Oklahoma State - Iowa State Dual
|-
|Win
|13–1
|align=left| Colten Carlson
|style="font-size:88%"|MD 16–5
|style="font-size:88%"|January 17, 2020
|style="font-size:88%"|Iowa State - South Dakota State Dual
|-
|Win
|12–1
|align=left| Jacori Teemer
|style="font-size:88%"|4–1
|style="font-size:88%" rowspan=3|January 11, 2020
|style="font-size:88%"|Iowa State - Arizona State Dual
|-
|Win
|11–1
|align=left| Hunter Ladnier
|style="font-size:88%"|MD 17–6
|style="font-size:88%"|Iowa State - Harvard Dual
|-
|Win
|10–1
|align=left| Matthew Dallara
|style="font-size:88%"|MD 18–5
|style="font-size:88%"|Campbell - Iowa State Dual
|-
|Win
|9–1
|align=left| Jerry Rubio
|style="font-size:88%"|Fall
|style="font-size:88%"|January 9, 2020
|style="font-size:88%"|Iowa State - Utah Valley Dual
|-
|Win
|8–1
|align=left| Tyler Shilson
|style="font-size:88%"|TF 21–6
|style="font-size:88%"|December 14, 2019
|style="font-size:88%"|Chattanooga - Iowa State Dual
|-
! style=background:white colspan=6 |2019 Cliff Keen Invitational  at 157 lbs
|-
|Win
|7–1
|align=left| Kendall Coleman
|style="font-size:88%"|4–0
|style="font-size:88%" rowspan=6|December 6–7, 2019
|style="font-size:88%" rowspan=6|2019 Cliff Keen Invitational
|-
|Win
|6–1
|align=left| Jacob Wright
|style="font-size:88%"|MD 9–0
|-
|Loss
|5–1
|align=left| Ryan Deakin
|style="font-size:88%"|3–9
|-
|Win
|5–0
|align=left| Justin Thomas
|style="font-size:88%"|6–5
|-
|Win
|4–0
|align=left| Avery Shay
|style="font-size:88%"|8–2
|-
|Win
|3–0
|align=left| Jared Franek
|style="font-size:88%"|11–4
|-
|Win
|2–0
|align=left| Kaleb Young
|style="font-size:88%"|6–1
|style="font-size:88%"|November 24, 2019
|style="font-size:88%"|Iowa - Iowa State Dual
|-
|Win
|1–0
|align=left| Jaden Fisher
|style="font-size:88%"|TF 18–3
|style="font-size:88%"|November 17, 2019
|style="font-size:88%"|Bucknell - Iowa State Dual
|-
! style=background:lighgrey colspan=6 |Start of 2019-2020 Season (freshman year)

Stats 

!  Season
!  Year
!  School
!  Rank
!  Weigh Class
!  Record
!  Win
!  Bonus
|-
|2021
|Sophomore
|rowspan=2|Iowa State University
|#3
|rowspan=2|157
|15–0
|100.00%
|73.33%
|-
|2020
|Freshman
|#4 (DNQ)
|18–1
|94.74%
|47.37%
|-
|colspan=5 bgcolor="LIGHTGREY"|Career
|bgcolor="LIGHTGREY"|33–1
|bgcolor="LIGHTGREY"|97.06%
|bgcolor="LIGHTGREY"|60.60%

Collegiate awards & records 

Freshman (19-20)
NCAA Division I All-American First Team (157 lbs)
 Big 12 Conference (157 lbs)
Iowa State's first Junior World Champion in history

References

External links
 

American male sport wrestlers
1999 births
Living people
Iowa State Cyclones wrestlers
Sportspeople from Canton, Ohio
Amateur wrestlers
Iowa State University alumni